Engleside Christian School is a private pre-kindergarten through 6th grade Christian school in Alexandria, Virginia. It is Baptist by affiliation and a member of the Old Dominion Association of Christian Schools, a chapter of the AACS.

Engleside Christian School (ECS) offers its students dedicated Christian teachers and favorable teacher to student ratios. ECS uses a phonics based reading program and advanced curriculum with technology integration, but provides a well-rounded experience with quality music programs and various service opportunities. There are daily Bible classes as well as a weekly chapel program. As a religious program, ECS and its various programs are exempt from state licensure.

References

External links

Old Dominion Association of Christian Schools
American Association of Christian Schools

Christian schools in Virginia
Educational institutions established in 1970
Private elementary schools in Virginia
Schools in Alexandria, Virginia
1970 establishments in Virginia